From Babel to Dragomans: Interpreting the Middle East is a 2004 book written by Middle-East historian Bernard Lewis. The book comprises a series of scholarly essays and speeches given by Lewis over a period of four decades on the topic of the Middle East and the Islamic world.

Contents
Chapter 1 : An Islamic mosque  
Chapter 2 : From Babel to Dragomans
Chapter 3 : Middle East feasts  
Chapter 4 : Iran in history 
Chapter 5 : Palimpsests of Jewish history : Christian, Muslim and secular diaspora
Chapter 6 : Some notes on land, money and power in medieval Islam 
Chapter 7 : An interpretation of Fatimid history   
Chapter 8 : Propaganda in the pre-modern Middle East : a preliminary classification
Chapter 9 : Monarchy in the Middle East  
Chapter 10 : Religion and murder in the Middle East
Chapter 11 : The Mughals and the Ottomans   
Chapter 12 : Europe and the Turks : the civilization of the Ottoman empire
Chapter 13 : Europe and Islam : Muslim perceptions and experience 
Chapter 14 : Cold war and detente in the sixteenth century 
Chapter 15 : From pilgrims to tourists : a survey of Middle Eastern travel 
Chapter 16 : The British mandate for Palestine in historical perspective 
Chapter 17 : Pan-Arabism 
Chapter 18 : The emergence of modern Israel 
Chapter 19 : Orientalist notes on the Soviet-United Arab Republic Treaty of 27 May 1971 
Chapter 20 : A taxonomy of group hatred 
Chapter 21 : Islam and the West 
Chapter 22 : The Middle East, westernized despite itself 
Chapter 23 : The Middle East in world affairs 
Chapter 24 : Friends and enemies : reflections after a war 
Chapter 25 : Return to Cairo 
Chapter 26 : Middle East at prayer 
Chapter 27 : At the United Nations 
Chapter 28 : The anti-Zionist resolution 
Chapter 29 : Right and left in Lebanon 
Chapter 30 : The Shi'a 
Chapter 31 : Islamic revolution 
Chapter 32 : The enemies of God 
Chapter 33 : The roots of Muslim rage 
Chapter 34 : The other Middle East problems 
Chapter 35 : Did you say "American imperialism"? : power, weakness, and choices in the Middle East 
Chapter 36 : The law of Islam 
Chapter 37 : Not everybody hates Saddam 
Chapter 38 : Mideast states : pawns no longer in imperial games 
Chapter 39 : What Saddam wrought 
Chapter 40 : The "sick man" of today coughs closer to home 
Chapter 41 : Revisiting the paradox of modern Turkey 
Chapter 42 : We must be clear 
Chapter 43 : Deconstructing Osama and his evil appeal 
Chapter 44 : Targeted by a history of hatred 
Chapter 45 : A time for toppling 
Chapter 46 : In defense of history 
Chapter 47 : First-person narrative in the Middle East 
Chapter 48 : Reflections on Islamic historiography 
Chapter 49 : The Ottoman archives : a source for European history 
Chapter 50 : History writing and national revival in Turkey  
Chapter 51 : On occidentalism and orientalism

References

2004 non-fiction books
Political books
Books by Bernard Lewis